Ian Michael McLoughlin (born 9 August 1991) is an Irish former professional footballer who played as a goalkeeper.

Club career

Ipswich Town
After impressing coaches on a trial at the start of 2009, McLoughlin signed a one-year contract in the February 2009. Having been in the reserve team for the year, Mcloughlin signed a one-year extension in the summer of 2010.

Lowestoft Town (loan)
Mcloughlin signed a 28-day loan deal for Lowestoft Town at the end of October 2010, due to an injury to their first team choice goalkeeper. McLoughlin made his debut for Lowestoft Town against Chippenham Town in an FA Trophy tie. In that game he failed to keep a clean sheet, the game ending in a 1–1 tie. The replay was on 2 November where Lowestoft Town won 3–1 to go into the next round.

Stockport County (loan)
Ian McLoughlin signed for League Two side Stockport County on a month's loan on 25 February 2011, after Stockport County's second choice goalkeeper broke his finger. He made his league debut on 1 March 2011, but was unable to keep a clean sheet as Stockport lost 2–1 to Cheltenham. However, McLoughlin did enough in that game to be handed his second league appearance the following weekend against Oxford United. He was still unable to prevent the opposition from scoring, but another solid performance helped Stockport to a 2–1 victory – only their second of 2011.

On 12 March 2011, McLoughlin kept the first professional clean sheet of his career, as he helped his bottom-of-the-league side to a creditable 0–0 draw at home to Burton Albion. A second shut-out looked to be on the cards a week later, as the young goalkeeper put in a fine display against Aldershot. However, a 94th-minute goal by Damian Spencer sent Stockport to yet another defeat.

County's poor league position was no reflection on the form of McLoughlin, though. He was putting in a consistent run of good performances, and in so-doing was keeping the experienced former Hull City and England 'C' keeper, Matt Glennon out of the side. On 24 March 2011, with McLoughlin's short-term loan deal due to expire, Ipswich manager Paul Jewell allowed the keeper to stay with the Hatters until the end of the season, by extending his loan deal.

During McLoughlin's time with Stockport, he discovered that he would be released at the end of the season by his parent club, Ipswich, along with academy scholars Rory McKeown and Josh Meekings. Town manager, Paul Jewell said:

Milton Keynes Dons
In July 2011, McLoughlin and Jay O'Shea signed with then League One club Milton Keynes Dons. He made his Dons debut coming off the bench in a second round FA Cup tie against away to Barnet, replacing injured Dons number one David Martin, the Dons won 3–1. His second and final appearance of the season came against Scunthorpe United at Glanford Park in a 3–0 win, coming on as a precautionary substitute again replacing Martin with only seconds left of the match. In the 2012/13 campaign, McLoughlin has played 90 minutes in a 2–0 defeat to Sunderland in the League Cup.

Walsall (loan)
He signed for Walsall on loan on 13 January 2013. He made his debut for loan club Walsall in a 3–1 win over Preston North End on the day he signed. He made six appearances during his loan at Walsall.

Newport County (loan)
On 11 March 2014, McLoughlin joined League Two side Newport County on an emergency loan until 9 April 2014. On 10 April 2014, McLoughlin extended his loan with the Exiles, until the end of the 2013–14 season.

Waterford
It was announced on 22 February that McLoughlin would be signing for League of Ireland First Division club Waterford. He made his debut in a 1–0 defeat to Athlone Town on 24 February 2017. McLoughlin suffered a back injury in a 0–0 draw with Longford Town on 1 April which ruled him out until July of the same year. His first involvement back with Waterford was appearing on the bench in the club's 2–1 win against Wexford on 7 July. He made his first start since injury on 11 August in a 3–0 defeat against Shelbourne in the FAI Cup. After Waterford beat Wexford 3-0 and Cobh Ramblers were defeated 3-0 by Cabinteely Waterford were officially crowned league champions and promoted back to the League of Ireland Premier Division. McLoughlin featured in Waterfords last two games of the season, a 1–0 win over Longford Town and the 2–1 defeat to Cobh Ramblers. McLoughlin finished the 2017 season with 9 appearances and 5 clean sheets to his name in an injury hit season for the goalkeeper.

International career
McLoughlin has been capped by Republic of Ireland under-19s. He made his debut for the national Under-21 team in February 2011, saving a penalty as Ireland drew 0–0 with Cyprus. He followed this up with a second cap in March 2011.

Career statistics

Honours
Milton Keynes Dons
Football League One runner-up: 2014–15

Waterford
League of Ireland First Division: 2017

References

External links

1991 births
Living people
Association footballers from Dublin (city)
Republic of Ireland association footballers
Republic of Ireland youth international footballers
Republic of Ireland under-21 international footballers
Association football goalkeepers
St Francis F.C. players
Ipswich Town F.C. players
Lowestoft Town F.C. players
Stockport County F.C. players
Milton Keynes Dons F.C. players
Walsall F.C. players
Newport County A.F.C. players
Waterford F.C. players
English Football League players
League of Ireland players